This is a list of women artists who were born in Pakistan or whose artworks are closely associated with that country.

A
Humaira Abid (active since 2000s), wood artist
Lubna Agha (1949–2012), painter, educator, art director
Anna Molka Ahmed (1917–1995), painter, educator
Sheherezade Alam (born 1948), ceramist

B
Huma Bhabha (born 1962), sculptor
Ambreen Butt (born 1969), Pakistani-American artist

J
Zehra Laila Javeri (born 1971), painter

K
Aisha Khalid (born 1972), contemporary artist

L
 Laila Khan (Singer)

M
Mehreen Jabbar (born 1971), TV and Film Director
Muniba Mazari (born 1987), painter, writer, activist
Huma Mulji (born 1970), sculptor, photographer

N
Nigar Nazar (born 1953), Pakistan's first female cartoonist

Q
Ayessha Quraishi (born 1970), contemporary artist

R
Sughra Rababi (1922–1994), painter, designer, sculptor

S
Huma Safdar (fl 1980s), arts teacher, artist
Hiba Schahbaz (born 1981), painter
Laila Shahzada  (1926–1994), painter
Shahzia Sikander (born 1969), painter, animator
Shamim Nazli (1940 - 2010), music director

W
Saira Wasim (born 1975), painter

Z 

 Zubeida Agha (1922-1997), Painter Artist

See also
List of Pakistani artists

-
Pakistani women artists, List of
Artists
Artists